Gudeodiscus is a genus of gastropods belonging to the family Plectopylidae.

The species of this genus are found in Southeastern Asia.

Species:

Gudeodiscus anceyi 
Gudeodiscus concavus 
Gudeodiscus cyrtochilus 
Gudeodiscus dautzenbergi 
Gudeodiscus emigrans 
Gudeodiscus eroessi 
Gudeodiscus fischeri 
Gudeodiscus francoisi 
Gudeodiscus franzhuberi 
Gudeodiscus fuscus 
Gudeodiscus giardi 
Gudeodiscus goliath 
Gudeodiscus hemisculptus 
Gudeodiscus hemmeni 
Gudeodiscus infralevis 
Gudeodiscus longiplica 
Gudeodiscus marmoreus 
Gudeodiscus messageri 
Gudeodiscus multispira 
Gudeodiscus oharai 
Gudeodiscus okuboi 
Gudeodiscus otanii 
Gudeodiscus phlyarius 
Gudeodiscus pulvinaris 
Gudeodiscus quadrilamellatus 
Gudeodiscus robustus 
Gudeodiscus soosi 
Gudeodiscus suprafilaris 
Gudeodiscus szekeresi 
Gudeodiscus ursula 
Gudeodiscus villedaryi 
Gudeodiscus werneri 
Gudeodiscus yanghaoi 
Gudeodiscus yunnanensis

References

Gastropods